Between Them is a 2021 Canadian romantic comedy film, written and directed by Noël Mitrani.

The film premiered in the United States at the Tampa International Gay and Lesbian Film Festival on October 3, 2021.

Plot 
A brilliant professor of Russian origin, sickly jealous, is convinced that his wife is cheating on him. He hires a female private detective to follow her. Soon after, the detective develops a strong attraction to her target.

Cast 
 Veronika Leclerc Strickland as Valérie Cochelin-Bouchard
 Mélanie Elliott as Lucie Corel
 Vitali Makarov as Dimitri Corel
 Daniel Murphy as William Horster
 Elliott Mitrani as The Young Dealer
 Laurent Lucas as The Follower in the street
 Natacha Mitrani as Pauline

Awards 
The film received a Special Jury mention at the Crossing the Screen Film Festival in 2022.

References

External links 
 

2021 films
2021 romantic comedy films
2021 LGBT-related films
Canadian romantic comedy films
Canadian LGBT-related films
Films directed by Noël Mitrani
Lesbian-related films
LGBT-related romantic comedy films
French-language Canadian films
2020s Canadian films